Thierville is a commune in the Eure department in Normandy in northern France. It is around 30 km south-west of Rouen city centre, and around 130 km north west of Paris.

Thierville is remarkable as one of only 12 villages in all of France with no men lost from World War I. Even more remarkably, Thierville also suffered no losses in the Franco-Prussian War and World War II,
nor in the First Indochina War nor the Algerian War. All the soldiers who took part in these five wars came back home.

Population

Personalities
 Probable birthplace of Theobald of Bec, archbishop of Canterbury

See also
Communes of the Eure department
Thankful Villages

References

Communes of Eure